Weissach im Tal is a municipality (Gemeinde) in the Rems-Murr-Kreis district of Baden-Württemberg, Germany. It belongs to the metropolitan region of Stuttgart . On 31 December 2005 it had a population of 7,205. Weissach im Tal is twinned with Marly in France and Lommatzsch in Saxony. Its mayor is Daniel Bogner. In Aichholzhof is the biggest school complex, called "Bildungszentrum Weissach im Tal, with all three types of schools after the elementary school (Hauptschule, Realschule and Gymnasium) around a radius of about 30 km (~16,6 nm).

History
5000-2000 BC: first signs of human life in the vicinity
16 July 1027: first documented mention of the Weissach brook
1231: first documented mention of Cottenweiler
1245: first documented mention of Unterweissach and Oberweissach
1 July 1971: the municipality of Weissach im Tal is created from the villages of Unterweissach, Oberweissach, Cottenweiler, Bruch,Aichholzhof and Wattenweiler.

Geography

Geographical location
Weissach im Tal lies 7 km south-east of Backnang and 30 km north-east of Stuttgart, at the feet of the Swabian Forest. It is located in the "Backnanger Bucht" (engl. Bay of Backnang). The Backnanger Bucht is the area from the Weissacher Tal (ger. Weissach Valley) to Backnang, which is surrounded like a sickle by foothills of the Swabian Forrest.

Structure

Honours
Weissach im Tal received a prize for the most sustainable municipality in Germany  in 2003 and in 2004.

References

External links
Official website (in German)

Rems-Murr-Kreis
Württemberg